Makot (in Hebrew: מכות) (in English: "Lashes") is a tractate of the Mishnah and Talmud. It is the fifth volume of the order of Nezikin. Makkot deals primarily with laws of the Jewish courts (beis din) and the punishments which they may administer, and may be regarded as a continuation of tractate Sanhedrin, of which it originally formed part.

In its scope of application are the topics of:

The false witnesses (Edim Zomemim)
The exile in a city of refuge. (Aray Miklat)
The lashes administered by the court. (Makkot)

The third chapter of tractate Makkot enumerates 59 offenses, each entailing lashes. Of these, three are marital sins of priests; four, prohibited inter-marriages; seven, sexual relations of an incestuous nature; eight, violations of dietary laws; twelve, various violations of the negative precepts; twenty-five, abuses of Levitical laws and vows. When the offense has been persisted in, the punishment depends on the number of forewarnings (see Hatra'ah). The Mishnah gives 39 as the maximum number of stripes the court may impose for any one misdemeanor; but the convict must be examined as to his physical ability to endure the full count without endangering his life. The convict is bound in bent position to a post, and the public executioner administers the punishment with a leather strap while one of the judges recites appropriate Scriptural verses (Deut. 28:58-59; 29:8; Psalm 78:38). Anyone guilty of a sin which is punished by Kareth ("excision") may be cleared by flagellation. The author of this midrash, Ḥanina b. Gamaliel, adds, "If by the commission of a sin one forfeits his soul before God, so much the more reason is there for the belief that, by a meritorious deed, such as voluntary submission to punishment, his soul is saved."

References

Talmud
Jewish courts and civil law